Joseph Joshua Weiss (J J Weiss) (30 August 1905 – 9 April 1972)  was a Jewish-Austrian  chemist and Professor at the Newcastle University. He was a pioneer in the field of radiation chemistry and photochemistry.

Education and career 
Weiss was born in 1905 in Austria. He had obtained a Dipl.Ing. degree in the Technische Hochschule in Vienna. He entered the Textile Institute at Sorau in 1928 and was the head of the chemistry department there. He left his post two years later to become an assistant to the German chemist Fritz Haber at the Kaiser Wilhelm Institute for Physical Chemistry and Elektrochemistry in Berlin. Together they discovered the Haber–Weiss reaction. He fled with Haber (who was born Jewish) from Nazi Germany to Cambridge in 1933. He later moved to University College London, where he got his PhD in 1935 from Prof Frederick George Donnan. in 1937 he started teaching at the King's College in Durham, which later became  Newcastle University. In the thirties, Weiss published several of his ideas on electron transfer processes in the mechanisms of thermal and photochemical reactions in solution.

In 1956 he was appointed a professor of Radiation Chemistry at  Newcastle University.

Honors and awards 
In 1968 he received an honorary degree from the Technical University of Berlin. In 1970 he received the Marie Curie Medal from the Curie Institute, and officially retired from his chair at Newcastle. In 1972 the Association for Radiation Research established the Weiss Medal, named after him.

Personal life 
In 1942, Weiss married Frances Sonia Lawson, whom he would go on to have two sons and a daughter with.

See also
 Haber–Weiss reaction

References

External links 
Professor J. J. Weiss, 1905-1972, International Journal of Radiation Biology, Volume 22, Issue 4 October 1972, pages 311–312. Prof George Scholes.
 The Weiss medal at the Association for Radiation Research website

1905 births
1972 deaths
Austrian physical chemists
Austrian emigrants to the United Kingdom
Academics of Newcastle University
Jewish scientists
Austrian Jews
British people of Austrian-Jewish descent
British physical chemists
Photochemists
TU Wien alumni
Alumni of University College London